Emmanuel Eloy Colombano (born June 15, 1983 in Pehuajo) is an Argentine footballer who plays for Club Defensores del este, de la LPF (Liga Pehuajense de Futbol).

Colombano played for Estudiantes de La Plata from 2001 to 2005 in the Primera División Argentina.

Defensa Y Justicia 
He then played for Defensa y Justicia from 2005 to 2006 in the Primera B Nacional Argentina.

Kanzas City Wizards 
The Kansas City Wizards of Major League Soccer signed him on August 8, 2007 but he was released on June 21, 2008. He played 17 games for the Wizards and scored one goal.

References

External links
Profile on the Kansas City Wizard's official site
 BDFA profile

1983 births
Living people
Argentine expatriate sportspeople in the United States
Argentine footballers
Estudiantes de La Plata footballers
Defensa y Justicia footballers
Sporting Kansas City players
Club Atlético Atlanta footballers
Sportspeople from Buenos Aires Province
Major League Soccer players
Association football midfielders